McCartin is a surname. Notable people with the surname include:

Joe McCartin (born 1939), Irish politician
Joseph McCartin (born 1959), American historian
Mandy McCartin (born 1958), English artist
Paddy McCartin (born 1996), Australian footballer
Tom McCartin (born 1999), Australian footballer